Lazar Markovich Khidekel (Vitebsk 1904  –  Leningrad 1986) was an artist, designer, architect and theoretician, who is noted for realizing the abstract, avant-garde Suprematist movement through architecture.

Early life
In 1918 at the age of 14, Khidekel was selected by Marc Chagall to study at the Vitebsk school of art, where he first met Kazimir Malevich and El Lissitzky. Khidekel became one of the founders of the group UNOVIS – Affirmers of New Art, led by Malevich and one of a few of Malevich's students, along with Ilya Chashnik and Nikolai Suetin, who deeply embraced Suprematist style and philosophy, and constituted the nucleus of genuine followers who soon become into their master's partners and assistants.

Contributions
By developing Suprematist ideas, Khidekel early defined his personal approach to Suprematist canon, introducing his own Suprematist painterly idioms, forms, ideas, and thoughts.

Rapid maturation of Lazar Khidekel’s creative approach during the vital years of 1919–1922 at Vitebsk Art School, defined his role in developing Suprematism’s inherent potential in painting and architecture. Elaborating conceptual approach and crossing disciplinary divide, Khidekel's contribution was critical in extricating from two-dimensional Suprematist shape to its three-dimensional, spatial expression, and as noted Maria Kokkori, Khidekel was distinguished by drawing buildings and building drawings.

In December 2020, after El Lissitzky left for Moscow, Khidekel and his classmate Ilya Chashnik headed the Architecture and Technical Department of the Vitebsk Art School.
Inspired by his artistic imagination, Khidekel developed a lifelong fascination with visionary and imaginary architecture that he knew could only become a reality in the distant future.

Suprematism
He played an important role in the development of Suprematism, applying its precepts to both practical architectural designs and imaginary floating structures of the future. He was instrumental in the transition from planar Suprematism to volumetric Suprematism, creating axonometric projections (The Aero-club: Horizontal architecton, 1922–23), making three-dimensional models, such as the architectons, designing objects (model of an "Ashtray", 1922–23), and producing the first Suprematist architectural project (The Workers’ Club, 1926). In the mid-1920s, he began his journey into the realm of visionary architecture. Directly inspired by Suprematism and its notion of an organic form-creation continuum, he explored new philosophical, scientific and technological futuristic approaches, and proposed innovative solutions for the creation of new urban environments, where people would live in harmony with nature and would be protected from man-made and natural disasters (his still topical proposal for flood protection – the City on the Water, 1925, etc.).

In 1926, while a student of the Architectural College (PIGI) in Petrograd, he created the first real Suprematist architectural project. His immense influence on the students and professors of PIGI resulted in a series of collaborative works with his professors A.S. Nikolsky and G. Simonov that defined Lazar Khidekel’s groundbreaking role in developing Suprematist and Constructivist-Suprematist style as an ultimate trend of the Leningrad avant-garde architecture of mid 1920s – early 1930s.

In the mid 1920s he envisioned his projects of the futurist cities such as Aero-city, Garden-city, City on the Poles and on the Water, that firstly young Lazar Khidekel defined in his 1920 hand lithographed manifesto “AERO. Articles and Projects”. In this publication Lazar defined new social and aesthetic approaches and solutions to the issues of the ecological impact on the environment produced by the modern industrial civilization.

He was the only architect from Malevich's group who completed innovative ideas in the building of residential complexes, theaters, movie-houses, and in drafting plans for new forms of skyscrapers. In the middle of the 1920s Khidekel was exploring specialized projects of buildings for a new way of life, the communal housing in Suprematist style, as well as he was the first in the 20th century to create projects of futuristic cities.

References

Further reading 
 Berkovich, Gary. Reclaiming a History. Jewish Architects in Imperial Russia and the USSR. Volume 2. Soviet Avant-garde: 1917–1933. Weimar und Rostock: Grunberg Verlag. 2021 
 Selim O. Chan-Magomedow. Pioneers of Soviet Architecture: The Search for New Solutions in the 1920s and 1930s. New York, Rizzoli, 1987
 Alexandra Schatskikh. Unovis: Epicenter of a New World at The Great Utopia. The Russian and Soviet Avant-Garde 1915-1932. Solomon Guggenheim Museum, State Tretiakov Gallery, State Russian Museum, Schirn Kunsthalle, Frankfurt, 1992 
 Lazar Markovich Khidekel. Suprematism and Architecture. Leonard Hutton Galleries, New York, 1995.
 Selim Khan-Magomedov: “The Suprematist Architecture of Lazar Khidekel”
 Alla Efimova. Surviving Suprematism: Lazar Khidekel. Judah L. Magnes Museum, Berkeley CA, 2004. 
 S. O. Khan-Magomedov. Lazar Khidekel (Creators of Russian Classical Avant-garde series) Moscow, 2008 (Russian), 2010 (English)
 Floating Worlds and Future Cities: The Genius of Lazar Khidekel, Suprematism and the Russian Avant-Garde.  YIVO, Lazar Khidekel Society, NY 2013
 Lazar Khidekel and Suprematism. Prestel Publishing 2014. Regina Khidekel, with contributions by Constantin Boym, Magdalena Dabrowski, Charlotte Douglas, Tatyana Goryacheva, Irina Karasik, Boris Kirikov and Margarita Shtiglits, and Alla Rosenfeld 
 They Will Understand Us in 100 Years. Lazar Khidekel. Khidekel, Regina, ed. and contributor, Alexander Buras, Maria Kokkori, Valery Shishanov, Roi Salgueiro Barrio, Tatyand Kotovich. (Lazar Khidekel Society, NY, 2020) (bilingual - English & Russian)

Soviet artists
1904 births
1986 deaths